A library is a collection of books or an institution lending books and providing information.

Library may also refer to:

Music
 Library Records, a record label
 "Library", a song by Bridgit Mendler from her 2016 EP Nemesis
"Library", a song by Macintosh Plus from her 2011 album Floral Shoppe

Science and technology
 Library (biology), a collection of molecules in a stable form that represents some aspect of an organism
 Library (computing), a collection of subprograms used to develop software
 Digital library, an online database of digital objects
 Library (electronics), a collection of cells, macros or functional units that perform common operations
 Library, a type of object in the IBM i operating system which is used to group other objects together.
 Library, a virtual folder that aggregates content from various locations; see Features new to Windows 7#Libraries

Other uses
 Library, Pennsylvania, United States, an unincorporated community
 Library station (PAAC), a light rail station in South Park, Pennsylvania, United States
 Library (UTA station), a transit station in Salt Lake City, United States
 Library (journal), a former American literary magazine

See also
 The Library (disambiguation)